Porthill Park, also known as the Old County Ground, is a cricket ground in Wolstanton, Staffordshire.  The first recorded match on the ground was in 1920, Staffordshire played Cheshire in the grounds first Minor Counties Championship match.  Staffordshire used the ground from 1920 to 1966 and again between 1999 and 2004.  In total, the ground has hosted 45 Minor Counties Championship matches and 5 MCCA Knockout Trophy matches, the last of which saw Staffordshire play Northumberland in 2004.

The ground has also hosted a single List-A match between Staffordshire and the Warwickshire Cricket Board in the 2001 Cheltenham & Gloucester Trophy.

In local domestic cricket, the ground is the home of Porthill Park Cricket Club who play in the North Staffordshire and South Cheshire League.

References

External links
Porthill Park on CricketArchive
Porthill Park on Cricinfo

Cricket grounds in Staffordshire
Sports venues completed in 1920